Alfonso Barrantes Lingán (San Miguel de Pallaques, November 27, 1927 – Havana, December 2, 2000) was a Peruvian politician in the mid-1980s who served as Mayor of Lima from 1984 to 1986. He ran for President of Peru two times, losing on both occasions.

Early life and education
He was born in San Miguel Province, Cajamarca, Peru in 1927. He lived with his mother in the Lima Province of San Miguel. He studied law at the National University of San Marcos and became involved with the APRA party which eventually became his political enemy. He became president of the Student Association.

Political career

Mayor of Lima
Affiliated with the United Left Party, he was the mayor of Lima from 1984 to 1986. During his mayoral term, he was known as El Frejolito (Little Bean) and was known for his campaign to ensure a daily glass of milk for every child in Lima. This program still survives today.  His Lieutenant Mayor was Henry Pease.

Presidential campaign
He ran for President of Peru in 1985 and came in second place. He withdrew before the runoff and Alan García of the APRA was elected president. In 1990, he ran again but placed 5th and Alberto Fujimori was elected president in the runoff against Mario  Vargas Llosa.

Retirement and death
He died in Havana, Cuba in December 2000 at the age of 73. He was buried in Los Sauces Sector in Cementerio Jardines de la Paz in La Molina District, Lima.

1927 births
2000 deaths
People from San Miguel Province
Peruvian politicians
Mayors of Lima
United Left (Peru) politicians
Candidates for President of Peru
20th-century Peruvian lawyers